Whitney Williams (born 1970/1971) is an American businesswoman and political candidate. In October 2019, Williams announced her candidacy for the 2020 Montana gubernatorial election, but she was defeated in the Democratic primary.

Early life and education 

Williams is a sixth-generation Montana native. She is the daughter of the former Montana Senate majority leader Carol Williams and former congressman Pat Williams. The Washington Post has called the Williams family the "first family of Montana politics."

Williams earned a Bachelor of Arts degree from the University of Montana, where she studied political science, forestry and Native American studies.

Career 
Williams worked in the Clinton administration, first as an intern, and then as travel director for first lady Hillary Clinton. Williams later served as Washington State finance cochairman for Hillary Clinton's 2008 presidential campaign.

In 2001, she joined Casey Family Programs and helped establish the $600 million Marguerite Casey Foundation. Since 2003, Williams has served as founder and CEO of williamsworks, a Montana-based consultancy agency. The firm has provided strategic services to nonprofit, philanthropic and corporate clients including Toms Shoes, the Bill & Melinda Gates Foundation, Nike Foundation, the Wikimedia Foundation and Thorn.

Williams is a member of the Council on Foreign Relations.

Philanthropy 

Williams previously served on the board of trustees for the Glacier National Park Fund as well as on the boards of directors for City Year Seattle and New Futures. In 2010, Williams cofounded the Eastern Congo Initiative with Ben Affleck and serves on the board as vice chairman. In 2021, she founded the Snowbird Fund, which provides financial support for Montana families who are searching for missing family members.

Politics 

On October 3, 2019, Williams announced her candidacy for Governor of Montana in 2020, receiving an endorsement from former governor Brian Schweitzer.

She faced incumbent lieutenant governor Mike Cooney but lost the June 2, 2020 Democratic primary with 45.14% of the vote. Cooney lost the general election to former congressman Greg Gianforte.

References

External links
Campaign website
williamsworks Twitter feed
Fund instituted to help Native families find missing people
Snowbird Fund aims to help MMIP families with immediate funds
How Montana Took a Hard Right Turn Toward Christian Nationalism

American philanthropists
Businesspeople from Montana
Women in Montana politics
Living people
Montana Democrats
University of Montana alumni
Year of birth missing (living people)
Candidates in the 2020 United States elections
21st-century American women